Sergey Aleksandrovich  Tolchinsky (born February 3, 1995) is a Russian professional ice hockey forward who is currently playing with Avangard Omsk of the Kontinental Hockey League (KHL). He has formerly played with the Carolina Hurricanes of the National Hockey League (NHL).

Playing career
Tolchinsky played in the 2008 Quebec International Pee-Wee Hockey Tournament with the HC CSKA Moscow youth team. Undrafted, Tolchinsky played with Krasnaya Armiya Moscow in the Minor Hockey League in Russia before opting to continue his junior career in North America with the Sault Ste. Marie Greyhounds of the Ontario Hockey League.

On August 22, 2013, Tolchinsky was signed to a three-year entry-level contract with the Carolina Hurricanes. He was returned to the Greyhounds of the OHL to continue his development in the 2013–14 season. At the conclusion of his second season with Sault Ste. Marie, Tolchinsky was signed to an amateur try-out contract with the Hurricanes AHL affiliate, the Charlotte Checkers to make his professional debut in a single game to end the year.

In the 2015–16 season, his first full professional year, Tolchinsky was recalled to make his NHL debut with the Carolina Hurricanes on March 31, 2016.

In his final year under contract with the Hurricanes, Tolchinsky continued with the Checkers in the AHL for the 2017–18 season. Unable to add to his NHL experience, Tolchinsky appeared in 43 regular season games for 26 points. On May 7, 2018, with Tolchinsky not appearing in the post-season, the Checkers confirmed that he had left the team at his request and returned to Russia as an impending restricted free agent from the Hurricanes.

On June 21, 2018, it was announced that Tolchinsky had returned to former club CSKA Moscow, on an initial try-out basis.

After two seasons within CSKA Moscow, Tolchinsky left at the conclusion of his contract to sign a two-year contract with his second KHL club, Avangard Omsk, on 8 May 2020. In the 2020–21 season, while playing on Avangard's top scoring line Tolchinsky broke out offensively, recording career best marks with 15 goals, 31 assists for 46 points through 51 regular season games. As the second placed Eastern conference team, Tolchinsky continued his standout play in the post-season with Avangard, leading the club with 20 points in 24 playoff games scoring. He scored the championship clinching goal, in a 1–0 victory, to help Avangard Omsk to their first Gagarin Cup on 29 April 2020. He was named as the KHL Playoffs MVP in collecting his second Gagarin cup.

Career statistics

Regular season and playoffs

International

Awards and honors

References

External links
 

1995 births
Living people
Avangard Omsk players
Carolina Hurricanes players
Charlotte Checkers (2010–) players
HC CSKA Moscow players
Russian ice hockey left wingers
Sault Ste. Marie Greyhounds players
Ice hockey people from Moscow
Undrafted National Hockey League players